The 1910 American Grand Prize was a Grand Prix auto race held on closed public roads outside Savannah, Georgia on November 12, 1910.  It was the second edition of the Automobile Club of America's American Grand Prize.  The race was won by American David Bruce-Brown in a Benz.

Summary
After a successful race in 1908, the Automobile Club of America made plans with the rival American Automobile Association to hold the Grand Prize and Vanderbilt Cup together on the Long Island Motor Parkway in 1909.  However, only the Vanderbilt race was held, and the Grand Prize pushed back to 1910. After the 1910 Vanderbilt Cup saw the deaths of 2 riding mechanics and several serious spectator injuries, the Grand Prize was cancelled once again. A last-minute request by the Savannah Automobile Club saved the race for the year, but only gave one month to prepare the course. A shorter 17-mile (27 km) course was laid out, but due to the short notice, many European teams were not able to make the trip; only 6 European cars entered the event, down from 14 two years ago.

The race began at 9 AM, with cars leaving the start line at 30-second intervals.  Victor Hémery, driving a Benz, led early. Arthur Chevrolet was second after lap 1, but would eventually be overtaken by the factory Benzes and Fiats before falling out of the race on lap 9.  Felice Nazzaro took over second place and pushed hard to catch Hémery.  After setting the lap record on lap 7, Nazzaro slid off the road into a ditch, bending his rear axle; he would retire a few laps later.  Wagner assumed the lead, but he too would leave the road and strike a tree on lap 17.  He resumed, but front axle damage later sent him into a cartwheel at speed, ending his race.

Ralph De Palma, Bruce-Brown, and Hémery took over the first three positions, within two minutes of each other.  On the penultimate lap, De Palma cracked a cylinder in the last of the Fiats.  At the finish, Hémery crossed the line first due to the staggered start, and as in 1908 was forced to wait for the next car to cross the line.  In the end, Bruce-Brown finished just 1.42 seconds faster than Hémery.

Classification

References

External links
 American Grand Prize Races historical marker

United States Grand Prix
American Grand Prize
American Grand Prize
American Grand Prize
History of Savannah, Georgia
November 1910 sports events